Sukomobanare Island is one of the islands of Amami Islands of Satsunan Islands, Japan, administratively belongs to Setouchi, Ōshima District, Kagoshima Prefecture. It is about 6.4 kilometers from south of Eniyabanare Island, and about 5.6 kilometers southwest of Sukomo Village on western Kakeroma Island. It is rectangular in shape with 2 kilometers long and 400 to 700 meters wide.

See also

 Desert island
 List of islands

References

 
Islands of Kagoshima Prefecture
Satsunan Islands
Uninhabited islands of Japan